Traditions of intolerance: Historical Perspectives on Fascism and Race Discourse in Britain is a book edited by Tony Kushner and Kenneth Lunn.  It presented the newest research into antisemitism, racism, and fascism in British society.

It is a selection of papers from an academic conference organised jointly by the University of Southampton and Portsmouth Polytechnic in Southampton, England, in September 1987.  A conference organised to address the new research opportunities opened up by the release of government records referred to as the 'Mosley Papers'.

It was published in 1989 by Manchester University Press as 245-page hardcover.  It was distributed in the United States and Canada by St. Martin's Press.

Contents

1989 non-fiction books
History books about the United Kingdom
Racism in the United Kingdom
20th-century history books